The 1975–76 season was Paris Saint-Germain's 6th season in existence. PSG mainly played their home league matches at the Parc des Princes in Paris, but once at the Stade Yves-du-Manoir in Colombes as well after reaching their 44-game quota at the Parc. The club registered an average attendance of 17,249 spectators per match. The club was presided by Daniel Hechter. The team was coached by Robert Vicot until August 1975. Just Fontaine took over as manager in September 1975. Jean-Pierre Dogliani began the campaign as team captain, but Fontaine gave the armband to Humberto Coelho in December 1975.

Summary

Despite an ambitious recruitment in 1975–76, including the signings of well-established players like Humberto Coelho and Jean-Pierre Tokoto, the league campaign ended in an underwhelming 14th place marked by the divorce between manager Just Fontaine and captain Jean-Pierre Dogliani. Fontaine, formerly the club's sporting director, had replaced Robert Vicot early in the season and then stripped Dogliani of the captain's armband. On the bright side, PSG reached the French Cup quarterfinals for the third season in a row.

In the pre-season, Daniel Hechter relaunched the Tournoi de Paris, a friendly competition originally created in 1957 by Racing Paris. Reinforced with Dutch legend Johan Cruyff and Serbian star Dragan Džajić for the occasion, PSG narrowly lost to Spanish side Valencia in the final in front of a sold-out Parc des Princes.

Additionally, the club inaugurated the first center of the Paris Saint-Germain Academy in November 1975 at the Camp des Loges. François Brisson, Jean-Marc Pilorget, Lionel Justier and Thierry Morin were part of the center's maiden generation. They all made their professional debuts as starters in a 2–3 league defeat to Reims at the Parc des Princes on in December 1975.

Players 

As of the 1975–76 season.

Squad

Out on loan

Transfers 

As of the 1975–76 season.

Arrivals

Departures

Kits 

French radio RTL was the shirt sponsor. French sportswear brand Kopa, created by French footballer Raymond Kopa, was the kit manufacturer.

Friendly tournaments

Tournoi de Paris

Competitions

Overview

Division 1

League table

Results by round

Matches

Coupe de France

Round of 64

Round of 32

Round of 16

Quarter-finals

Statistics 

As of the 1975–76 season.

Appearances and goals 

|-
!colspan="16" style="background:#dcdcdc; text-align:center"|Goalkeepers

|-
!colspan="16" style="background:#dcdcdc; text-align:center"|Defenders

|-
!colspan="16" style="background:#dcdcdc; text-align:center"|Midfielders

|-
!colspan="16" style="background:#dcdcdc; text-align:center"|Forwards

|-

References

External links 

Official websites
 PSG.FR - Site officiel du Paris Saint-Germain
 Paris Saint-Germain - Ligue 1 
 Paris Saint-Germain - UEFA.com

Paris Saint-Germain F.C. seasons
Association football clubs 1975–76 season
French football clubs 1975–76 season